West Point Widow is a 1941 American comedy film directed by Robert Siodmak and starring Anne Shirley, Richard Carlson and Richard Denning.

Main cast
Anne Shirley as Nancy Hull
Richard Carlson as Dr. Jimmy Krueger
Richard Denning as Lt. Rhody Graves
Frances Gifford as Daphne
Maude Eburne as Mrs. Willits
Janet Beecher as Mrs. Graves
Archie Twitchell as Joe Martin
Lillian Randolph as Sophie
Cecil Kellaway as Dr. Spencer
Patricia Farr as Miss Hinkle
Sharon Lynn as Jennifer as a baby
Jean Hall as Jennifer
Eddie Conrad as Mr. Metapoulos

References

External links

1941 comedy films
American comedy films
Films directed by Robert Siodmak
Films produced by Sol C. Siegel
American black-and-white films
Films with screenplays by F. Hugh Herbert
1940s American films